An overlay network is a computer network that is layered on top of another network.

Structure 
Nodes in the overlay network can be thought of as being connected by virtual or logical links, each of which corresponds to a path, perhaps through many physical links, in the underlying network. For example, distributed systems such as peer-to-peer networks and client–server applications are overlay networks because their nodes run on top of the Internet.

The Internet was originally built as an overlay upon the telephone network, while today (through the advent of VoIP), the telephone network is increasingly turning into an overlay network built on top of the Internet.

Uses

Enterprise networks 

Enterprise private networks were first overlaid on telecommunication networks such as Frame Relay and Asynchronous Transfer Mode packet switching infrastructures but migration from these (now legacy) infrastructures to IP based MPLS networks and virtual private networks started (2001~2002).

From a physical standpoint, overlay networks are quite complex (see Figure 1) as they combine various logical layers that are operated and built by various entities (businesses, universities, government etc.) but they allow separation of concerns that over time permitted the buildup of a broad set of services that could not have been proposed by a single telecommunication operator (ranging from broadband Internet access, voice over IP or IPTV, competitive telecom operators etc.).

Internet 

Telecommunication transport networks and IP networks (which combined make up the broader Internet) are all overlaid with at least an optical fiber layer, a transport layer and an IP or circuit switching layers (in the case of the PSTN).

Over the Internet 

Nowadays the Internet is the basis for more overlaid networks that can be constructed in order to permit routing of messages to destinations not specified by an IP address. For example, distributed hash tables can be used to route messages to a node having a specific logical address, whose IP address is not known in advance.

Overlay networks have also been proposed as a way to improve Internet routing, such as through quality of service guarantees to achieve higher-quality streaming media. Previous proposals such as IntServ, DiffServ, and IP multicast have not seen wide acceptance, largely because they require modification of all routers in the network. On the other hand, an overlay network can be incrementally deployed on end-hosts running the overlay protocol software, without cooperation from ISPs. The overlay has no control over how packets are routed in the underlying network between two overlay nodes, but it can control, for example, the sequence of overlay nodes a message traverses before reaching its destination.

For example, Akamai Technologies manages an overlay network which provides reliable, efficient content delivery (a kind of multicast). Academic research includes End System Multicast and Overcast, which is multicasting on an overlay network; RON (Resilient Overlay Network) for resilient routing; and OverQoS for quality of service guarantees, among others.

Internet of Things 

The dispersed nature of the Internet of things (IoT) presents a major operational challenge that is uncommon in the traditional Internet or enterprise networks. Devices that are managed together --- say a fleet of railcars --- are not physically colocated. Instead, they are widely geographically distributed. The operational approaches for management and security used in enterprise networks, where most hosts are densely contained in buildings or campuses, do not translate to the IoT. IoT devices operate outside of the enterprise network security and operational perimeter and the corporate LAN firewall can’t protect them. Dispatching technicians is expensive, so manual provisioning and configuration doesn’t scale. Devices connect to the Internet via a variety of last-mile ISPs, so many devices won’t share a common IP prefix and addresses will change at arbitrary times. Any configuration based on these IPs will require continued upkeep and will often be out-of-date, exposing hosts and devices to external threats.

Advantages and Benefits

Resilience 
Resilient Overlay Networks (RON) are architectures that allow distributed Internet applications to detect and recover from disconnection or interference. Current wide area routing protocols that take at least several minutes to recover from are improved upon with this application layer overlay. The RON nodes monitor the Internet paths among themselves and will determine whether or not to reroute packets directly over the internet or over other RON nodes thus optimizing application specific metrics.

The Resilient Overlay Network has a relatively simple conceptual design. RON nodes are deployed at various locations on the Internet. These nodes form an application layer overlay that cooperate in routing packets. Each of the RON nodes monitor the quality of the Internet paths between each other and uses this information to accurately and automatically select paths from each packet, thus reducing the amount of time required to recover from poor quality of service.

Multicast 
Overlay multicast is also known as End System or Peer-to-Peer Multicast. High bandwidth multi-source multicast among widely distributed nodes is a critical capability for a wide range of applications, including audio and video conferencing, multi-party games and content distribution. Throughout the last decade, a number of research projects have explored the use of multicast as an efficient and scalable mechanism to support such group communication applications. Multicast decouples the size of the receiver set from the amount of state kept at any single node and potentially avoids redundant communication in the network.

The limited deployment of IP Multicast, a best effort network layer multicast protocol, has led to considerable interest in alternate approaches that are implemented at the application layer, using only end-systems. In an overlay or end-system multicast approach, participating peers organize themselves into an overlay topology for data delivery. Each edge in this topology corresponds to a unicast path between two end-systems or peers in the underlying Internet. All multicast-related functionality is implemented at the peers instead of at routers, and the goal of the multicast protocol is to construct and maintain an efficient overlay for data transmission.

Disadvantages 
 Slow in spreading the data.
 Long latency.
 Duplicate packets at certain points.

List of overlay network protocols 
Overlay network protocols based on TCP/IP include:
 http / https
 Distributed hash tables (DHTs) based on the Chord
 JXTA
 XMPP: the routing of messages based on an endpoint Jabber ID (Example: nodeId_or_userId@domainId\resourceId) instead of by an IP Address
 Many peer-to-peer protocols including Gnutella, Gnutella2, Freenet, I2P and Tor.
 PUCC
 Solipsis: a France Télécom system for massively shared virtual world

Overlay network protocols based on UDP/IP include:
 Distributed hash tables (DHTs) based on Kademlia algorithm, such as KAD, etc.
 Real Time Media Flow Protocol – Adobe Flash

See also 
 Darknet
 Mesh network
 Net
 Peercasting
 Virtual Private Network

References

External links 
 List of overlay network implementations, July 2003
 Resilient Overlay Networks
 Overcast: reliable multicasting with an overlay network
 OverQoS: An overlay based architecture for enhancing Internet QoS
 RFC 3170
  Multicast over TCP/IP HOWTO
  End System Multicast

Overlay networks
Anonymity networks
Network architecture
Computer networking